Luigi Scotti (born 14 January 1932) is an Italian former magistrate, politician and jurist. Between 6 February 2008 and 8 May 2008 he was Minister of Justice in Romano Prodi's government.

Biography

Academic career
Graduated in law with honors from the University of Naples, Scotti benefited from one of the five scholarships for the best graduates in the academic year with the adjoining role of volunteer assistant.
In 1965 he passed the competition for ordinary assistant and in 1967 he obtained free teaching in Navigation Law.
In 1969 he was appointed professor at the Faculty of Economics and Commerce of the University of Naples. In 1971 he became professor in charge and stabilized and in 1986 he passed the competition for ordinary professor but did not exercise this profession intending to remain in the judiciary.
Subsequently, he carried out numerous post-graduate courses, especially in the field of organization of justice and judiciary.

Judicial career
In 1962 Scotti was assigned to the magistrate's office of Calitri as a praetor.
Appointed court magistrate in 1964, he continued his career within the judiciary becoming judge in 1966 and appellate magistrate in 1972: thanks to this qualification he was elected member of the Superior Council of the Magistracy, of which he was a member from 1976 to 1981.

On 10 April 1979 he was appointed Magistrate of Cassation and from November 1982 he worked at the Ministry of Justice first as deputy head of the Legislative Office, then from 1984 as head of the same office. At the same time he was appointed regent of the General Directorate of the Judicial Organization and subsequently regent of the General Inspectorate, being appointed Magistrate of Cassation with higher managerial functions on 10 April 1987.

From 23 May 1997 he returned to the function of judge as president of the Court of Rome.

Political career
On 17 May 2006 he resigned from all his judicial positions as he was appointed Undersecretary of Justice in the second Prodi government, indicated by the Party of Italian Communists led by Oliviero Diliberto.

On 7 February 2008 he was appointed Minister of Justice in the Prodi II government that had already resigned, replacing Romano Prodi who had taken over the interim after Clemente Mastella's resignation.

On 9 May 2008 the mayor of Naples Rosa Russo Iervolino appointed him Assessor for legal affairs, security and transparency.

References
  Biografia di Luigi Scotti. Italian Ministry of Justice. Accessed 2010-03-10.

1932 births
Living people
Jurists from Naples
Italian Ministers of Justice
Independent politicians in Italy
Politicians from Naples